Marek Matiaško (born 29 October 1977) is a former Slovak biathlete.

He was born in Bojnice. He participated at the 2002 Winter Olympics in Salt Lake City.  At the 2006 Winter Olympics in Turin he placed 5th in the 20 km. He also represented Slovakia at the 2010 Winter Olympics in Vancouver.

Matiaško retired from the sport after the 2009–10 season.

References

External links
 

1977 births
Living people
Slovak male biathletes
Olympic biathletes of Slovakia
Biathletes at the 2002 Winter Olympics
Biathletes at the 2006 Winter Olympics
Biathletes at the 2010 Winter Olympics
Universiade medalists in biathlon
Universiade bronze medalists for Slovakia
Competitors at the 1999 Winter Universiade
Sportspeople from Bojnice